Bob Maslen-Jones (3 May 1921 – 13 July 2005) was a British sports shooter. He competed in the 300 m rifle event at the 1948 Summer Olympics.

References

1921 births
2005 deaths
British male sport shooters
Olympic shooters of Great Britain
Shooters at the 1948 Summer Olympics
Sportspeople from Wolverhampton